The Men's 5000 metres event at the 2011 European Athletics U23 Championships was held in Ostrava, Czech Republic, at Městský stadion on 16 July.

Medalists

Results

Final
16 July 2011 / 19:20

Intermediate times:
1000m: 3:00.43 Vincent Boucena 
2000m: 6:00.07 Hayle Ibrahimov 
3000m: 9:00.89 Vyacheslav Shalamov 
4000m: 11:50.37 Jesper van der Wielen

Participation
According to an unofficial count, 25 athletes from 14 countries participated in the event.

References

5000 metres
5000 metres at the European Athletics U23 Championships